Copris caobangensis is a species of dung beetles described in 2018. The holotype was collected in Pia Oac Nature Reserve, Caobang Province, Vietnam at an altitude of 1210–1230 m in 2017.

References

Coprini
Beetles described in 2018